Carl Gottfried Neumann (also Karl; 7 May 1832 – 27 March 1925) was a German mathematician.

Biography
Neumann was born in Königsberg, Prussia, as the son of the mineralogist, physicist and mathematician Franz Ernst Neumann (1798–1895), who was professor of mineralogy and physics at Königsberg University. Carl Neumann studied in Königsberg and Halle and was a professor at the universities of Halle, Basel, Tübingen, and Leipzig.

While in Königsberg, he studied physics with his father, and later as a working mathematician, dealt almost exclusively with problems arising from physics. Stimulated by Bernhard Riemann's work on electrodynamics, Neumann developed a theory founded on the finite propagation of electrodynamic actions, which interested Wilhelm Eduard Weber and Rudolf Clausius into striking up a correspondence with him. Weber described Neumann's professorship at Leipzig as for "higher mechanics, which essentially encompasses mathematical physics," and his lectures did so. Maxwell makes reference to the electrodynamic theory developed by Weber and Neumann in the Introduction to A Dynamical Theory of the Electromagnetic Field (1864).

Neumann worked on the Dirichlet principle, and can be considered one of the initiators of the theory of integral equations. The Neumann series, which is analogous to the geometric series

but for infinite matrices or for bounded operators, is named after him.

Together with Alfred Clebsch, Neumann founded the mathematical research journal Mathematische Annalen. He died in Leipzig.

The Neumann boundary condition for certain types of ordinary and partial differential equations is named after him (Cheng and Cheng, 2005).

See also
Liouville–Neumann series
Neumann functions

Works by Carl Neumann

 
 
 
 
 Das Dirichlet'sche Princip in seiner Anwendung auf die Riemann'schen Flächen (B. G. Teubner, Leipzig, 1865)
 Vorlesungen über Riemann's Theorie der Abel'schen Integrale  (B. G. Teubner, 1865)
 
 Theorie der Bessel'schen functionen: ein analogon zur theorie der Kugelfunctionen (B. G. Teubner, 1867)
 Untersuchungen über das Logarithmische und Newton'sche potential (B. G. Teubner, 1877)
 
 Über die Methode des arithmetischen Mittels (S. Hirzel, Leipzig, 1887) 
 Allgemeine Untersuchungen über das Newton'sche Princip der Fernwirkungen, mit besonderer Rücksicht auf die elektrischen Wirkungen (B. G. Teubner, 1896)
 Die elektrischen Kräfte (Teubner, 1873–1898)

Notes

References
 
 
 Cheng, A. and D. T. Cheng (2005). Heritage and early history of the boundary element method, Engineering Analysis with Boundary Elements, 29, 268–302.

1832 births
1925 deaths
19th-century German mathematicians
20th-century German mathematicians
Scientists from Königsberg
People from the Province of Prussia
Recipients of the Pour le Mérite (civil class)
University of Königsberg alumni
Martin Luther University of Halle-Wittenberg alumni
Academic staff of the Martin Luther University of Halle-Wittenberg
Academic staff of the University of Tübingen
Academic staff of Leipzig University
Recipients of the Thorvaldsen Medal
Burials at the Garrison Cemetery, Copenhagen